Poudeh (also Romanized as Pūdeh) is a village in Qombovan Rural District, in the Central District of Dehaqan County, Isfahan Province, Iran. At the 2006 census, its population was 2,183, in 621 families.

Notable people from Poudeh 
 Hossein Dehghan - Minister of Defense, retired IRGC Air Force officer, 2021 presidential election candidate

References 

Populated places in Dehaqan County